The 57th annual Venice International Film Festival was held between 30 August to 9 September 2000. The Golden Lion was awarded to Dayereh directed by Jafar Panahi.

Jury
The following people comprised the 2000 jury:
 Miloš Forman (head of jury)
 Jennifer Jason Leigh
 Samira Makhmalbaf 
 Tahar Ben Jelloun 
 Giuseppe Bertolucci
 Claude Chabrol 
 Andreas Kilb (film critic)

Official selection

In competition

Autonomous sections

Venice International Film Critics' Week
The following feature films were selected to be screened as In Competition for this section:
 Merry Christmas (Felicidades) by Lucho Bender (Argentina)
 Poetical Refugee (La Faute à Voltaire) by Abdellatif Kechiche (France)
 Pictures Deep in One's Eyes (Lontano in fondo agli occhi) by Giuseppe Rocca (Italy)
 Nights (Noites) by Cláudia Tomaz (Portugal)
 The Day I Became a Woman (Roozi ke zan shodam) by Marzieh Meshkini (Iran)
 Scoutman (Pain) by Masato Ishioka (Japan)
 You Can Count on Me by Kenneth Lonergan (United States)

Awards
 Golden Lion:
 Dayereh (Jafar Panahi)
Grand Special Jury Prize:
Before Night Falls (Julian Schnabel)
Silver Lion:
Uttara (Buddhadev Dasgupta)
Golden Osella:
Outstanding Technical Contribution: Claudio Fava, Marco Tullio Giordana and Monica Zapelli (For the screenplay) I cento passi
Volpi Cup:
Best Actor: Javier Bardem Before Night Falls
Best Actress: Rose Byrne The Goddess of 1967
Special Mention Best Short Film: Faouzi Bensaïdi The Rain Line
Special Mention Best Short Film: Sandro Aguilar Sem Movimento
The President of the Italian Senate's Gold Medal:
La virgen de los sicarios (Barbet Schroeder)
Marcello Mastroianni Award:
Liam (Megan Burns)
Luigi De Laurentiis Award:
Poetical Refugee (Abdellatif Kechiche)
Career Golden Lion:
Clint Eastwood
FIPRESCI Prize:
Best First Feature: Thomas in Love (Pierre-Paul Renders)
Best Feature: Dayereh (Jafar Panahi)
OCIC Award:
Liam (Stephen Frears)
Honorable Mention: Before Night Falls (Julian Schnabel)
Honorable Mention: Dayereh (Jafar Panahi)
Netpac Award:
Zhantai (Jia Zhangke)
Special Mention: Seom (Ki-duk Kim)
Don Quixote Award:
Protagonisti, i diritti del '900 (Daniele Segre)
UNICEF Award:
Dayereh (Jafar Panahi)
UNESCO Award:
Roozi ke zan shodam (Marzieh Meshkini)
Pasinetti Award:
Best Film: I cento passi (Marco Tullio Giordana)
Best Actor: Holy Tongue (Antonio Albanese and Fabrizio Bentivoglio)
Best Actress: Dayereh (Fereshteh Sadre Orafaee, Fatemeh Naghavi, Nargess Mamizadeh, Maryiam Palvin Almani, Mojgan Faramarzi, Elham Saboktakin, Monir Arab, Maedeh Tahmasebi, Maryam Shayegan, Khadijeh Moradi, Negar Ghadyani and Solmaz Panahi)
Pietro Bianchi Award:
Gillo Pontecorvo
Isvema Award:
Roozi ke zan shodam (Marzieh Meshkini)
FEDIC Award:
Placido Rizzotto (Pasquale Scimeca)
Little Golden Lion:
I cento passi (Marco Tullio Giordana)
Cult Network Italia Prize:
Noites (Cláudia Tomaz)
FilmCritica "Bastone Bianco" Award:
Word and Utopia (Manoel de Oliveira)
Future Film Festival Digital Award:
Time and Tide (Tsui Hark)
Special Mention: Denti (Gabriele Salvatores)
Laterna Magica Prize:
Thomas in Love (Pierre-Paul Renders)
Sergio Trasatti Award:
Dayereh (Jafar Panahi)
CinemAvvenire Award:
Best Film on the Relationship Man-Nature: Freedom (Šarūnas Bartas)
Best Film: I cento passi (Marco Tullio Giordana)
Best First Film: Roozi ke zan shodam (Marzieh Meshkini)
Cinema for Peace Award: Poetical Refugee (Abdellatif Kechiche)
Children and Cinema Award:
Johnny the Partisan (Guido Chiesa)
Rota Soundtrack Award:
Before Night Falls (Carter Burwell)
Special Director's Award:
The Wrestlers (Buddhadeb Dasgupta)

References

External links 

Venice Film Festival 2000 Awards on IMDb

Venice
Venice
Venice
Venice Film Festival
Film
August 2000 events in Europe
September 2000 events in Europe